The Broken Arrow Ledger was a weekly newspaper, published on Wednesdays and delivered mostly for free in Broken Arrow, Oklahoma. The newspaper was established in 1904. Over the century, the names have changed, i.e. Broken Arrow Ledger-Democrat, Broken Arrow Democrat, Broken Arrow Daily Ledger, Broken Arrow Scout, when new owners took over the company. The Broken Arrow Ledger was purchased as part of the Oklahoma Weekly Group in 2015 by BH Media, and was published by the Tulsa World until February 22, 2017. BH Media/Tulsa World still owns the rights to the Broken Arrow Ledger.
The final edition was published on February 22, 2017.

References

External links
 

Broken Arrow, Oklahoma
Newspapers published in Oklahoma
Publications established in 1904
1904 establishments in Oklahoma Territory
2017 disestablishments in Oklahoma